Cipura is a genus of perennial, herbaceous and bulbous plants in the family Iridaceae, related to the genus Cypella. The plants are widely distributed in Mexico, Central, the West Indies, and South America.

 Species
 Cipura campanulata Ravenna – from central Mexico to northern Brazil
 Cipura formosa Ravenna – eastern + central Brazil
 Cipura gigas Celis, Goldblatt & Betancur  - Colombia + Venezuela.
 Cipura insularis Ravenna – western Cuba
 Cipura paludosa Aubl. – Mexico, South America (as far south as Paraguay), Central America, and the West Indies; naturalized in India
 Cipura paradisiaca Ravenna – Goiás State in Brazil
 Cipura rupicola Goldblatt & Henrich – eastern Colombia + southern Venezuela
 Cipura xanthomelas Maxim. ex Klatt – eastern + central Brazil

References

External links

 Images of species of Cipura from the Pacific Bulb Society

Iridaceae genera
Iridaceae